Kiernan Brennan Shipka (born November 10, 1999) is an American actress, best-known for her roles as Sally Draper in the AMC drama series Mad Men (2007–2015), Sabrina Spellman in the Netflix series Chilling Adventures of Sabrina (2018–2020) and the sixth season of The CW series Riverdale (2021–2022), B. D. Hyman in the FX series Feud: Bette and Joan (2017), and Jinora in The Legend of Korra (2012–2014).

Shipka has also starred in numerous films, including Carriers (2009), Flowers in the Attic (2014), The Blackcoat's Daughter (2015), and The Silence (2019).

Early life
Kiernan Brennan Shipka was born in Chicago, Illinois, to John Young Shipka, a real estate developer, and Erin Ann Brennan. Shipka started taking ballroom dancing classes at the age of five, and was still attending classes as of March 2012. Her family relocated to Los Angeles, California when she was six to help with her acting career.

Career

2006–2015: Beginnings and Mad Men

Shipka made her television debut at five months of age on the hospital drama ER. She also began doing commercial-print modeling when she was a baby. After undertaking numerous small television roles, her first major role was as Sally Draper, the daughter of main character Don Draper, on the 2007–2015 TV series Mad Men. She won the role after two auditions. She was a recurring guest star for the show's first three seasons, then became a series regular in season four.

As part of Mad Men's ensemble cast, she won the Screen Actors Guild Award for Outstanding Performance by an Ensemble in a Drama Series in 2008 and 2009. Shipka received praise for her performance on Mad Men. In 2010, Austin American-Statesman critic Dale Roe named her as his dream nominee for the Primetime Emmy Award for Outstanding Guest Actress in a Drama Series, writing, "This 10-year-old actress was so affecting as troubled Sally Draper last season that it seems odd that she's only just been upgraded to series regular. If Shipka's upcoming Mad Men work—struggling with the broken marriage of her parents and entering preteendom in the tumultuous 1960s—remains as amazing as it was in season three, this is a ballot wish that could come true next year."

In 2014, Shipka was named one of "The 25 Most Influential Teens of 2014" by Time magazine. That same year, IndieWire included her in their list of "20 Actors To Watch That Are Under 20". Shipka starred in the 2014 Lifetime movie Flowers in the Attic, and co-starred (with Emma Roberts) in the 2015 Oz Perkins horror film The Blackcoat's Daughter.

2016–present: Further work and streaming projects
In 2017, she portrayed B.D. Hyman, daughter of Bette Davis, in the FX television series Feud: Bette and Joan. In January 2018, it was announced that Shipka would be starring as Sabrina Spellman in Netflix's Chilling Adventures of Sabrina series based on the comic series of the same name. The first part was released by Netflix on October 26, 2018, and an episode that December. The show ran for three more parts, concluding on December 31, 2020, with a total of 36 episodes. Shipka would reprise the role in a sixth season episode of Riverdale, “Chapter Ninety-Nine: The Witching Hour(s)”, aired on December 7, 2021.

Shipka co-starred in a 2019 Christmas romantic comedy film directed by Luke Snellin, Let It Snow, based on the novel of the same name. Shooting began in February 2019.

Shipka next played a deaf teenager opposite Stanley Tucci in John R. Leonetti's horror film The Silence, based on the 2015 horror novel of the same name by Tim Lebbon. Netflix released The Silence on April 10, 2019. Shipka learned American Sign Language for the role. Leonetti praised her performance saying "She's acting alongside Stanley Tucci, and believe me, she's more than holding her own. It's been spellbinding watching her."

In May 2021, Shipka was cast in the HBO political drama limited series White House Plumbers. She played Bea Johnson, the daughter of two intellectually disabled parents, in the 2022 drama Wildflower.

In September 2022, Shipka was cast in Red One, co-starring Dwayne Johnson and Chris Evans.

Filmography

Film

Television

Music videos

Video games

Awards and nominations

References

External links

 
 
 
 

21st-century American actresses
Actresses from Chicago
American child actresses
American child models
American film actresses
American television actresses
American voice actresses
Living people
1999 births